Timmo Niesner (born November 5, 1971 in Berlin) is a German actor and voice actor.

Biography
Timmo Niesner had his breakthrough as a 12-year-old when he appeared on television.

Timmo Niesner is the Official German dub-over artist of Elijah Wood, as well as dubbing over the roles of Tom Welling, Peter Sarsgaard and Topher Grace in German.

Since 1999, Timmo voice dubbed over Elijah Wood's roles on Media, in German.

In videogames, He also gave the German dubbing voice to Spyro the Dragon in The Legend of Spyro trilogy, in which his original English voice was also performed by Elijah Wood. He was also the German voice of WALL-E in WALL-E and Chappie in Chappie. Most recently his served as the voice of Arno Dorian in the video game Assassin's Creed: Unity.

External links
 
 

1971 births
Living people
Male actors from Berlin
German male child actors
German male voice actors
German male film actors
German male television actors